Trita Parsi (born 21 July 1974) is the co-founder and executive vice president of the Quincy Institute for Responsible Statecraft, as well as the founder and former president of the National Iranian American Council. He regularly writes articles and appears on TV to comment on foreign policy and is the author of Treacherous Alliance, A Single Roll of the Dice and Losing an Enemy.

Early life and education
Born in Behbahan, Iran, his father Dr. Touraj Parsi was a politically active university professor, at Jondi-Shapoor University of Ahvaz, who had been jailed twice, first by Mohammad Reza Pahlavi and then following the Iranian Revolution by Ruhollah Khomeini, and Parsi moved with his family to Sweden at the age of four in order to escape the political repression in Iran. Parsi earned a master's degree in international relations at Uppsala University and a second master's degree in economics at Stockholm School of Economics.  As an adult, Parsi moved to the United States and studied foreign policy at the Johns Hopkins School for Advanced International Studies, where he received his Ph.D. in International Relations under Francis Fukuyama.

Career
Early in his career Parsi worked for the Swedish Permanent Mission to the United Nations in New York, where he served in the Security Council, handling the affairs of Afghanistan, Iraq, Tajikistan, and Western Sahara, and on the General Assembly's Third Committee, addressing human rights in Iran, Afghanistan, Myanmar and Iraq.

In 2003, Parsi served as an aide to Representative Bob Ney. Parsi has served as an adjunct professor of international relations at Johns Hopkins University SAIS, an adjunct scholar at the Middle East Institute and as a Policy Fellow at the Woodrow Wilson International Center for Scholars in Washington DC.

Parsi is an Iranian-Swedish dual national and a permanent resident of the United States. He is fluent in Persian, English, and Swedish.

Trita Parsi was awarded the 2016 Alumni of the Year prize from Uppsala University.

National Iranian American Council
In 2002, Parsi founded the National Iranian American Council (NIAC), whose stated purpose is "dedicated to strengthening the voice of Iranian-Americans and promoting greater understanding between the American and Iranian people. We accomplish our mission through expert research and analysis, civic and policy education, and community building." At NIAC's founding, Parsi argued "Our community is educated, affluent, dynamic, and professionally successful. However, we have yet to harness our immense human potential into constructive engagement in American civil society."

Through NIAC, Parsi supports engagement between the US and Iran, saying it "would enhance our [U.S.] national security by helping to stabilize the Middle East and bolster the moderates in Iran."

In a 2011 talk sponsored by the Institute for Global Law and Policy at the Harvard Law School, Parsi argued that the conflict between Israel and Iran was not ideological but strategic and geopolitical. In a 2012 article for Salon, Parsi accuses Israel of using "the threat of war to push the U.S. and EU into passing economic sanctions on Iran" and denounced those sanctions as "blind" and "indiscriminate."

Lobbying controversy and defamation lawsuit
In 2007, Arizona-based Iranian-American blogger Hassan Daioleslam began publicly asserting that NIAC was lobbying on behalf of the Islamic Republic of Iran. Daioleslam wrote in an internal email, "I strongly believe that Trita Parsi is the weakest part of the Iranian web because he is related to Siamak Namazi and Bob Ney... I believe that destroying him will be the start of attacking the whole web. This is an integral part of any attack on Clinton or Obama."

In response, Parsi sued him for defamation. In September 2012, a U.S. federal judge John D. Bates threw out the libel suit against Daioleslam on the grounds that "NIAC and Parsi had failed to show evidence of actual malice, either that Daioeslam acted with knowledge the allegations he made were false or with reckless disregard about their accuracy." Bates also wrote, "Nothing in this opinion should be construed as a finding that defendant’s articles were true. Defendant did not move for summary judgment on that ground, and it has not been addressed here."

Books

Treacherous Alliance
In 2007, Yale University Press published Treacherous Alliance: The Secret Dealings of Israel, Iran, and the United States. Parsi's work is an expansion of his 2006 Ph.D. dissertation written at Johns Hopkins University under the supervision of his Ph.D. adviser Francis Fukuyama. The book "takes a closer look at the complicated triangular relations between Israel, Iran, and the United States that continue to shape the future of the Middle East."  The book argues that the struggle between Israel and Iran is not ideological but strategic.

The book received many positive reviews. In Foreign Affairs, L. Carl Brown called the book a "well-constructed history" and former U.S. ambassador Peter Galbraith praised the book as "a wonderfully informative account."  The book was also praised by political scientist John Mearsheimer and former National Security Advisor Zbigniew Brzezinski who was on his dissertation committee. In 2008, Treacherous Alliance was awarded the silver medal (runner-up) in the Council on Foreign Relations' Arthur Ross Book Award.

Reviewing the book in Commentary in March 2008, however, Nathan Thrall found it "troubling" that a "litany of praise" had "been heaped on this book by authorities in American foreign policy and Middle East studies." Parsi, noted Thrall, believes that "the internal dynamics of states (i.e., their ideology, system of governance, ethnic makeup, class structure, and religion), while important, 'have little or no impact on their respective foreign policies.'" Thrall suggested that in propounding such a thesis, Parsi, "the head of a lobby promoting 'greater understanding' of Iran," may just be "doing his job. But the distinction between arriving at a conclusion and beginning with one is what separates the work of a historian from that of a lobbyist. In this case, it is a distinction that seems to be lost not only on him but on the luminaries who have lined up to endorse his defective scholarship and tendentious conclusions."

Treacherous Alliance received the 2010 Grawemeyer Award from the University of Louisville, given for "Ideas Improving World Order." Treacherous Alliance also won the 2008 Arthur Ross Silver Medallion from the Council on Foreign Relations, which described it as a "unique and important book" that "takes a closer look at the complicated triangular relations between Israel, Iran, and the United States that continue to shape the future of the Middle East."

In a 2011 interview with the Institute for Global Law and Policy at Harvard University, Parsi asserted that his thesis had "been vindicated" by recent events. "I believe it is increasingly clear that efforts to divide the region between moderates vs radicals, democracies vs non-democracies etc is of little utility and has no real explanatory value. Israel, for instance, who had sought to frame its rivalry with Iran as a struggle between the region's sole Western democracy against a fanatical Islamic tyranny, favored the status quo in Egypt and opposed the efforts to oust Mubarak." He added that "With the decline of the US, Israel's strategic paralysis and increased isolation in the region, the rise of Turkey, the 'revolutions' in Tunisia and Egypt, and Iran's continued difficulties in translating its strength to regional acceptance, the region is experiencing momentous changes both in its political structure and in its balance of power. An ideology based approach towards understanding these shifts won't get you far."

A Single Roll of the Dice: Obama's Diplomacy with Iran
In the 2012 book, Parsi's thesis is that US-Iran relations are in a stalemate caused by institutionalized enmity: "The thirty-year old US-Iran enmity is no longer a phenomenon; it is an institution." He argues that the way forth is through sustained diplomacy that he considers "the only policy that remains largely unexplored and that has a likelihood of achieving results amounting to more than kicking the can down the road."

Julian Borger wrote in The Guardian that A Single Roll of the Dice is "A carefully balanced and thoroughly researched account of the tortured US-Iranian relationship in recent years." L. Carl Brown from Foreign Affairs said the book is "the most incisive account available... eminently readable, sometimes gripping."

Reviewing the book in The Wall Street Journal, Sohrab Ahmari faults Parsi for failing to "re-examine U.S. policy and its underlying assumptions." Instead, he writes, "Quick to ascribe irrationality and bad faith to opponents of engagement, Mr. Parsi is charitable when it comes to examining the motivations of the Iranian side." In opposition to Parsi's position, Ahmari concludes, "Mr. Obama's engagement policy failed not because of Israeli connivance or because the administration did not try hard enough. The policy failed because the Iranian regime, when confronted by its own people or by outsiders, has only one way of responding: with a truncheon."

A Single Roll of the Dice: Obama's Diplomacy with Iran was selected by Foreign Affairs as the Best Book of 2012 on the Middle East.

Losing an Enemy
This book describes in detail the whole course of the extraordinarily complex international negotiation that led to the conclusion in Vienna on July 14, 2015.

Other literary works

Media appearances
Parsi has been a guest on The Colbert Report and The Daily Show with Jon Stewart. Parsi has frequently appeared on C-SPAN to discuss the Iran nuclear deal and Middle Eastern politics. Parsi also gave a widely viewed Ted Talk on the possibility of peace between Iran and Israel. In the talk, Parsi "shows how an unlikely strategic alliance in the past [between Iran and Israel] could mean peace in the future for these two feuding countries."

Parsi is a frequent guest on news programs including CNN, PBS Newshour, NPR, BBC, and Al Jazeera.

Personal life
Parsi is married to Amina Semlali, a human development specialist at the World Bank. They are raising a son together.

References

External links
 
 
 National Iranian American Council
 

1974 births
Living people
Iranian emigrants to the United States
American Zoroastrians
Iranian writers
Iranian emigrants to Sweden
Swedish emigrants to the United States
Paul H. Nitze School of Advanced International Studies alumni
Johns Hopkins University alumni
Johns Hopkins University faculty
Uppsala University alumni
Stockholm University alumni
Iran–United States relations